is a rechargeable contactless smart card ticketing system for public transport by Iyo Railway (Iyotetsu) in Matsuyama, Japan. The card was introduced from August 23, 2005, succeeding the previous e-card, a magnetic prepaid card. This is the first smart card system by Japanese transportation operators with Osaifu-Keitai mobile payment service (Mobile FeliCa), preceding that of Mobile Suica.

Types of cards
IC e-card
IC e-card commuter pass
Mobile e-card
JAL Mileage Bank Iyotetsu e-card
Ehime F.C. e-card

Usable area
Iyotetsu Lines
Heavy railways; Gunchū Line, Takahama Line, and Yokogawara Line.
Tramways, all the lines.
Iyotetsu Bus; all the regular bus lines, including limousine buses to Matsuyama Airport and Matsuyama Port, a railway-transfer bus between Takahama Station and Matsuyama Port, but excluding a service by Setouchi Bus.
Iyotetsu Taxi; Matsuyama area only.
Ishizuchisan SA and Iyonada SA at Matsuyama Expressway.
Whale Express, a highway bus between Matsuyama and Kōchi.
A few stores in Matsuyama, including Iyotetsu Takashimaya department store.

External links 
  IC e-card official website

Fare collection systems in Japan
Contactless smart cards